Karma to Burn is the first official live album from The Waterboys.  It also contains tracks from Mike Scott's solo career: "Bring 'em All In," "Long Way to the Light," "My Dark Side," and "Open."

Scott explains the name of the album as "experiences yet to be undergone in order to balance past actions" , a reference to the tenet of karma in Hinduism.  This is not the first reference to the concept made by the group; a song named "Karma" appeared as part of the single for "The Return of Pan" from Dream Harder.  Karma to Burn was one of a large number of titles that the band considered for the album, including "A Long Way to the Light," after the song about The Waterboys' break-up after Dream Harder.

The album cover was created by Toshifumi Tanabu.

"Long Way to the Light" was recorded in Warwick on 16 October 2003.  "Peace Of Iona," "Bring 'em All In," and "The Whole of the Moon" were recorded in Belfast two days later.  "Glastonbury Song" is from a concert at Plymouth on 29 October of that year.  "Medicine Bow" was recorded in Basingstoke on 13 October.  "The Pan Within" is taken from a Dublin show on 21 October.  "Open" is taken from two concerts, one in Liverpool on 26 October 2004, and from a later concert in Galway on 23 November.  "The Return of Jimi Hendrix" is from 25 November in Cork.  Both "My Dark Side" and "Fisherman's Blues" were recorded in Cheltenham on 30 October 2003.  "A Song for the Life" is from a 27 November 2004 show in Athlone.  "Come Live with Me" is also from two separate concerts, the same Galway show as "Open," and the same Cork show as "The Return of Jimi Hendrix."

Track listing
All songs by Mike Scott, except where noted.
 "Long Way to the Light" – 6.32
 "Peace of Iona" – 7.13
 "Glastonbury Song" – 4.35
 "Medicine Bow" (Scott, Anthony Thistlethwaite) – 3.09
 "The Pan Within" – 13.14
 "Open" – 4.14
 "The Return of Jimi Hendrix" – 5.16
 "My Dark Side" – 4.12
 "A Song for the Life" (Traditional) – 4.27
 "Bring 'Em All In" – 4.02
 "The Whole of the Moon" – 5.46
 "Fisherman's Blues" (Scott, Steve Wickham) – 5.56
 "Come Live with Me" (Felice Bryant, Boudleaux Bryant) – 7.10

Personnel

 Mike Scott - vocals, guitar, piano
 Steve Wickham - Electric Violin, mandoline, bells
 Carlos Hercules - drums, cymbal
 Steve Walters - Bass
 Richard Naiff - piano, organ
Sharon Shannon - accordion

References 

The Waterboys albums
2005 live albums